The following television stations broadcast on digital or analog channel 44 in Canada:

 CFTF-DT-11 in Carleton-sur-Mer, Quebec
 CHNB-DT-1 in Fredericton, New Brunswick
 CICO-DT-92 in Cloyne, Ontario
 CITY-DT in Toronto, Ontario
 CJEO-DT in Edmonton, Alberta

44 TV stations in Canada